The 1929 Rice Owls football team was an American football team that represented Rice University as a member of the Southwest Conference (SWC) during the 1929 college football season. In its first season under head coach Jack Meagher, the team compiled a 2–7 record (0–5 against SWC opponents) and was outscored by a total of 208 to 34.

Schedule

References

Rice
Rice Owls football seasons
Rice Owls football